Beauharnois—Laprairie was a federal electoral district in Quebec, Canada, that was represented in the House of Commons of Canada from 1935 to 1949.

This riding was created in 1933 from Beauharnois and Laprairie—Napierville ridings.  It was abolished in 1947 when it was redistributed into Beauharnois, Châteauguay—Huntingdon—Laprairie and Saint-Jean—Iberville—Napierville ridings.

It consisted of the county of Beauharnois (excluding the municipality of St-Etienne), the county of Laprairie, the municipalities of Ste-Philomène, St-Joachim and the towns of De Léry and of Châteauguay, and the municipality of Ste-Barbe.

Members of Parliament

This riding elected the following Members of Parliament:

Electoral history

|-
  
|Liberal
|Maxime Raymond
|align="right"|10,052 
  
|Conservative
|Noël Beausoleil
|align="right"|3,954    

|-
  
|Liberal
|Maxime Raymond 
|align="right"|11,244
  
|National Government
|Hormisdas Roy 
|align="right"|3,471

  
|Liberal
|Robert Cauchon
|align="right"|10,378 
  
|Progressive Conservative
|Arthur W. Sullivan
|align="right"|1,779

See also 

 List of Canadian federal electoral districts
 Past Canadian electoral districts

External links 
 Riding history from the Library of Parliament

Former federal electoral districts of Quebec